Richard MacQuire (born 17 February 1972, in Melbourne) is an Australia slalom canoeist who competed from the late 1980s to the mid-1990s. He finished 24th in the K-1 event at the 1996 Summer Olympics in Atlanta.

References
Sports-Reference.com profile

1972 births
Australian male canoeists
Canoeists at the 1996 Summer Olympics
Living people
Olympic canoeists of Australia